Henri Spade (16 July 1921 - 12 November 2008) was a French journalist, television producer and novelist. He co-produced La joie de vivre, the first entertainment program on French television, in the 1950s. He directed and produced television films. He was "a pioneer of French television".

Early life
Henri Spade was born on July 16, 1921 in Paris, France. He graduated from the University of Paris and the University of Strasbourg, where he studied the Humanities and the Law. During World War II, he joined the Free French Forces in Spain.

Career
Spade began his career as a journalist in Paris from 1945 to 1949. He became a television producer for Radiodiffusion-Télévision Française in 1949. He first co-produced Le Magazine du cinéma, a television program about cinema, with Robert Chazal, in 1949. With Jean Nohain, he co-produced over 200 episodes La joie de vivre from 1952 to 1959. Hosted by Jacqueline Joubert at the Alhambra theatre, it was the first entertainment program on French television and included performances by Edith Piaf, Maurice Chevalier, Mistinguett, Yves Montand, Jeanne Moreau, Elvire Popesco, Serge Reggiani, Jean Yanne and Danielle Darrieux, among others. It also included sketches by comedians like Roger Pierre and Bourvil. Moreover, it played an important role in the audiovisual democratisation of operettas.

Spade began teaching at his alma mater, the University of Paris, in 1971. A year later, in 1972, he became the deputy director of the Office de Radiodiffusion Télévision Française and, until 1988, director-producer of the Société française de production, where he produced and directed television films.

Spade was the author of fourteen novels and two non-fiction books. He was also a songwriter.

Death
Spade was married to Michèle Stouvenot, a journalist. He died on 12 November 2008 in Paris.

Works

Novels

Non-fiction

References

External links

1921 births
2008 deaths
Mass media people from Paris
University of Paris alumni
University of Strasbourg alumni
Free French military personnel of World War II
French television producers
French television directors
French male novelists
20th-century French novelists
French non-fiction writers
French songwriters
Male songwriters
20th-century French male writers
French male non-fiction writers
20th-century French journalists
Writers from Paris
French expatriates in Spain